1,4-Pentadiyne (penta-1,4-diyne) is a chemical compound belonging to the alkynes. The compound is the structural isomer to 1,3-pentadiyne.

Preparation 
Until the late 1960s, no successful synthesis of this seemingly simply preparable molecule was described. Although long-chain and more complex 1,4-diynes had been synthesized successfully before, synthesis approaches starting from sodium acetylide and propargyl bromide or from the acetylene Grignard reagent with propargyl bromide and copper(I) chloride failed and mostly 1,3-pentadiyne was obtained as rearrangement product.

The successful isolation in small amounts succeeded by reacting propargyl bromide and to the respective Normant cuprate converted acetylene grignard (usage of copper(I) chloride) in THF and an, compared to previous attempts additional, flash distillation and GLC of the distillate.

An improved synthesis method was published by Verkruijsse and Hasselaar in 1979. Copper chloride was substituted by copper(I) bromide as well as propargyl bromide by propargyl tosylate. At lower reaction temperatures and fewer by-products, the alkiyne was obtained after multistep extraction. According to the publication’s authors, this circumvented the problem that the solvent THF and the main compound share similar boiling points.

Moreover, a flash vacuum pyrolysis starting from 3-ethynylcycloprop-1-ene at 550 °C yields the compound and penta-1,2-dien-4-yne as sideproduct. Alternatively, a photolytic decomposition of cyclopentadienylidene via UV radiation is possible.

The compounds forms also during the exothermic reaction of allene and the ethynyl radical. This reaction is mainly of interest for astrochemistry.

Properties 
At room temperature the substance discolors from a colorless to a yellowish liquid, however, storage in diluted solutions at 0 °C is possible for multiple weeks.

While for 1,4-pentadiene the sp2-hybridization leads to a bond angle of 120° between the single and double bond, in 1,4-pentadiyne it is a 180° angle due to the sp-hybrid orbital. Both triple bonds in 1,4-position destabilize each other according to another study by 3.9 kcal · mol−1, a repulsion between the p orbital lobes close to the sp3-hybridized carbon has been postulated. According to a QCSID(T) calcuation, the alkiyne is destabilized relative to 1,3-pentadiyne by 25 kcal · mol−1.

Although microwave spectroscopy revealed besides a dipole moment of 0.516 D no significant distortions compared to an ideal tetrahedron, three different ionization energies are reported for the π-system.

Usage 
1,4-pentadiyne is a common starting material for the synthesis of heterobenzenes such as stiba-, arsa- and phosphabenzene and their substituted derivates.

References 

Diynes